Tysdalsvatnet or Tyssdalsvatnet is a lake in the municipalities of Hjelmeland and Strand in Rogaland county, Norway. The Norwegian National Road 13 (Rv13) runs along the northern side of the lake. The Svo Tunnel was completed in 2013 and it routes much of Rv13 through a mountain rather than along the narrow shoreline of the lake.

See also
List of lakes in Norway

References

Hjelmeland
Lakes of Rogaland